Coleophora legitima is a moth of the family Coleophoridae.

The larvae feed on Climacoptera species. They feed on the generative organs of their host plant.

References

legitima
Moths described in 1989